Seventh Heaven is the first studio album by the Japanese girl group Kalafina, released on 26 May 2009 under Sony Music Japan label. The album was named after the theme song they performed for the seventh chapter of the Anime movie Kara no Kyoukai.

Track listing

DVD

Usage in media
oblivious: ending theme song for Kara no Kyoukai Chapter 1
fairy tale: ending theme song for Kara no Kyoukai Chapter 6
Aria: ending theme song for Kara no Kyoukai Chapter 4
Kizuato: ending theme for Kara no Kyoukai Chapter 3
sprinter: ending theme for Kara no Kyoukai Chapter 5
Kimi ga Hikari ni Kaete yuku: ending theme for Kara no Kyoukai Chapter 2
seventh heaven: ending theme for Kara no Kyoukai Chapter 7

Charts

Release history

References

2009 debut albums
Kalafina albums
Japanese-language albums
SME Records albums